Headley Washington Cunningham,  (12 October 192922 September 2018) was a Jamaican politician. A member of the People's National Party, he was Speaker of the House of Representatives from 1989 to 1993.

Early life
Cunningham was born on 12 October 1929 in Darliston, Westermoreland, Jamaica, the youngest of three children to Frank and Estella (née Maxwell). He was educated at Cornwall College in Montego Bay, St James, after which he found employment as an accountant at the Kingston-based Public Works Department. Cunningham subsequently left for England to study law.

Career
Returning from England, Cunningham became president of the Cornwall Bar Association. He entered electoral politics in 1989, when he was elected as a member of parliament. From 1989 to 1993, he was Speaker of the House of Representatives. From 1992 to 1993, he sat on the executive committee of the Commonwealth Parliamentary Association, of which he was vice-chairperson. In 1998, Cunningham became a member of the Privy Council of Jamaica.

Death
Cunningham died on 22 September 2018 aged 88, after struggling with health issues. Official funerary rites were conducted by the government of Jamaica on 25 October at the Mount Carey Baptist Church in Anchovy, St James. Cunningham was buried on the same day at the church cemetery.

Recognition
In 2007, Cunningham was awarded the Order of Jamaica (OJ) for "outstanding service in the field of Law".

See also
 List of speakers of the House of Representatives of Jamaica

References

Speakers of the House of Representatives of Jamaica
Members of the Order of Jamaica
People's National Party (Jamaica) politicians
Cornwall College, Jamaica alumni
1929 births
2018 deaths